Alain Huck (born 1957, in Vevey) is a Swiss contemporary visual artist in the mediums of drawing, painting, installation and photography. He lives and works in Lausanne, Switzerland.

Active since 1985, he acquired important recognition since 2006 with his "Salons noirs" series, realistic large charcoal on paper drawings. His exhibitions include solo shows at the Musée Jenisch (2006), the MAMCO (2010), Art Unlimited Basel (2011), Museum of Fine Arts of Nancy (2012), The Armory Show (2014).

Bibliography

References

External links
 Works at Skopia Gallery

Swiss contemporary artists
Living people
1957 births